Dóra Þórhallsdóttir (23 February 1893 – 10 September 1964) was since 1917 the wife of Icelandic President Ásgeir Ásgeirsson and First Lady of Iceland from 1952 to 1964. She was the daughter of Þórhallur Bjarnarson (1855-1916), 6th Bishop of Iceland (1908–1916). Her brother was Tryggvi Þórhallsson, who was the 5th Prime Minister of Iceland (1927–1932).

Honours 
 : Dame Grand Cross of the Order of the Falcon (1 December 1953)

References 

Dóra Þórhallsdóttir 
1893 births
1964 deaths
Knights Grand Cross of the Order of the Falcon